Tannersville is an unincorporated community in Tazewell County, Virginia, United States. County is located in eastern time zone

Notable person
Billy Wagner, baseball player.

References

See also 
Claypool Hill, VA

Saltville, VA

Unincorporated communities in Tazewell County, Virginia
Unincorporated communities in Virginia